Pommes Frites is a New York City restaurant which specializes in Belgian-style  fries. The restaurant was located in the East Village at 123 2nd Avenue (near 7th Street), but relocated to 128 MacDougal Street after the original building was destroyed in a 2015 natural gas explosion.

Menu
The restaurant sells only one food item: fries, served in paper cones, with a variety of sauces to choose from. Fries are prepared in the Belgian style, deep fried twice at two different temperatures.

History
The shop was opened by Susan Levison, a Bronx native, in January 1997 after returning from a backpacking trip through the low countries. (At the time of its destruction, she co-owned the restaurant with Omer Shorshi.) Nine months after it opened, New York Magazine reported that there were lines outside the restaurant every day. At one time, the restaurant had expanded to three locations, but by 2013 only the original location remained.

Gas explosion
On March 26, 2015, the restaurant was destroyed when the building which housed it collapsed, following a natural gas explosion. No Pommes Frites customers or employees were seriously injured, although an employee and a customer of another nearby restaurant were killed.  Pommes Frites reopened on May 23, 2016.

References

External links

Restaurants in Manhattan
East Village, Manhattan
Restaurants established in 1997
1997 establishments in New York City
American companies established in 1997